The 2020 Charleston Southern Buccaneers football team represented Charleston Southern University as a member of the Big South Conference during the 2020–21 NCAA Division I FCS football season. Led by second-year head coach Autry Denson, the Buccaneers compiled an overall record of 2–2 with an identical mark in conference play, placing third in the Big South. Charleston Southern played home games at Buccaneer Field in Charleston, South Carolina.

Previous season

The Buccaneers finished the 2019 season 6–6, 4–2 in Big South play to finish in third place.

Preseason

Polls
In June 2020, the Buccaneers were predicted to finish third in the Big South by a panel of media and head coaches.

Schedule
Charleston Southern had games scheduled against Monmouth, Hampton, and Arkansas, which were canceled due to the COVID-19 pandemic.

References

Charleston Southern
Charleston Southern Buccaneers football seasons
Charleston Southern Buccaneers football